Danielle Cable: Eyewitness (also known as Eyewitness: The Danielle Cable Story) is a British television true crime drama film, based upon the murder of Stephen Cameron by Kenneth Noye in a road rage incident in 1996. The film was co-written for television by playwrights Kate Brooke and Terry Winsor, and was directed by Adrian Shergold. It was first broadcast on ITV on 14 April 2003. The film details the events following the killing, in which the sole witness to the murder, Cameron's fiancée Danielle Cable (Joanne Froggatt), is forced to change her identity and go into hiding after giving evidence which helped convict Noye in court.

The film was screened on the third anniversary of Noye's conviction for Stephen's murder, which occurred on 14 April 2000. Prior to filming, Froggatt met with the real-life Danielle Cable in a secret location, while under the protection of two bodyguards who prevented Danielle from revealing any information that might lead to her being found. Frogatt was later nominated for the Royal Television Society Award for Best Actress for her role as Cable, and the film itself was also nominated for the BAFTA TV Award for Best Single Drama. The film drew 8.59 million viewers on its debut broadcast. Notably, it has never been available on DVD, although it is available on YouTube.

Criticism
Stephen Cameron's parents, Toni and Ken, criticised the film following its broadcast, commenting; "We have seen it. There were loads of inaccuracies. In principle, I think it's a story that needed to be told, but Toni came across as hysterical and as a wimp, but she is a very strong person. We had no input whatsoever and we would have liked to have been contacted. At the end of the day it was our son, and Danielle lived with us for a long time."

Cast
 Joanne Froggatt as Danielle Cable
 Bill Paterson as DI Nick Biddiss
 Lindsey Coulson as Ann Cable
 Jamie Foreman as Keith Phelan
 Nigel Terry as Kenneth Noye
 Eamon Boland as Ken Cameron
 Alex Hassell as Stephen Cameron
 Tilly Vosburgh as Toni Cameron
 Jennifer Hennessy as DS Libby Marks
 Mark Letheren as DC Jason Wheeler
 Tim Woodward Jeff Mundy
 Paul Jesson as Brian Boyce
 Stephanie Leonidas as Kerri
 Kim Taylforth as Brenda Noye
 Chris Geere as Josh Harman
 Michael McKell as Terry Cable
 Connor McIntyre as Steve Allan
 Caroline Pegg as Sylvia Chapman
 Phil Kavanagh	as Paul Scobie
 Vincent John as Dave John
 James Rawlinson as Tom Adams
 Shane O'Connor as Michael Cable
 Anton Lesser as Henry Batten

References

External links

2003 television films
2003 films
British television films
British crime films
ITV television dramas
Television series by ITV Studios
Films shot in the United Kingdom
Films directed by Adrian Shergold
2000s English-language films
2000s British films